The State of Teng (1046–414BC) was a small Chinese state that existed during the Spring and Autumn period and the Warring States period, and was located in the south of modern-day Shandong province. Its territory is now the county-level city of Tengzhou.

Teng's ruling family was the Ji family, with the founder, Shu Xiu of Cuo (錯叔繡), being the 14th brother of King Wu of Zhou. It was conquered and annexed by the State of Yue during the reign of King Goujian of Yue (越王勾踐, r. 496–465BC).

Teng was a vassal of the State of Lu, and is famed as the birthplace of the Chinese philosopher Mozi and architect Lu Ban.  The name of the state survives in both the city of Tengzhou and the Chinese clan name of Teng.

It was conquered by King Zhugou  (朱勾, d.411 BC) of Yue. Then its nobility re-establish the country. Finally it was annihilated by King Kang of Song in 297 BC.

History of Shandong
Ancient Chinese states
Zhou dynasty